

Events
The White Hand Society disbands after police inaction and vigilantism in other Italian neighborhoods ends public support for the organization.
Timothy Sullivan escapes from the sanitarium and is later found dead near a Westchester County freight yard. 
 George Washington "Chuck" Connors, one of the last of the Tammany Hall associates, dies of heart failure in New York City's Hudson Street Hospital at the age of 61. Within several months, Frank "Mike the Dago" Salvatore succeeds Connors as the political boss of Chinatown. 
Cleveland gangster Thomas Joseph McGinty (aka T.J. McGinty) organizes a gang of labor sluggers competing against rival Cleveland News sluggers Arthur McBride's Mayfield Road Mob during Cleveland's "Circulation Wars". 
May 22 – A peace agreement is signed, with the exception of the Four Brothers, ending the tong war between the On Leong, Hip Sing, and the Kim Lan Wui Saw tongs.  
November – Preparing to assault workers who had refused to strike, rival labor sluggers led by "Dopey" Benny Fein are met by a combined number of smaller gangs as street fighting breaks out in front of a Greenwich Street hat shop. This is the first of many skirmishes which will eventually lead up to the First Labor Slugger War.

Arts and literature
The Gangster (1913) starring Lionel Adams, Ferdinand Tidmarsh and Edna Luby is released.

Births
February 8 – Carmine Lombardozzi "The Doctor", New York labor racketeer, illegal gambling and drug trafficker as a Capodecina of the Gambino crime family and former associate of Meyer Lansky 
February 12 – Anthony Corallo "Tony Ducks", Lucchese crime family Don and Mafia Commission member
March 26 – Victor Riesel, New York organized crime journalist
April 30 – Sam DeCavalcante "The Plumber", New Jersey mobster
October 6 – Leonard Patrick, Chicago Outfit member and informant

Deaths
Timothy Sullivan, New York gambling syndicate leader, Tammany Hall politician and associate of the Whyos and Monk Eastman street gangs.

References 

Organized crime
Years in organized crime